The Society of Foreign Missions is a missionary Roman Catholic Society of Apostolic Life of Pontifical Right for men. It is devoted to missions mainly in Latin America and the Far East. It was founded in 1921 in Quebec, Canada. Members add the nominal letters P.M.E. after their names to indicate membership in the Congregation.

History
The society was established on 2 February 1921 in Quebec, Canada, where it still has its headquarters: 180 place Juge-Desnoyers, Pont-Viau, Ville de Laval, QC H7G IA4, Canada.

Statistics 
As of 2020, it has 8 houses and 95 members, including 90 priests.

Superiors general 
 Fr. Jean-Avila Roch (1932.08.16 – 1938.07.11)
 Fr. Edgar Larochelle (藍德) (1938.07.11 – 1958.02.19)
 Fr. Gilles Joseph Napoléon Ouellet (1958.02.19 – 1967.09.19) (later Archbishop, see below)
 Fr. Viateur Allary (1967.09.19 – 1973.07.05)
 Fr. André Vallée (1973.07.05 – 1979.06.05) (later Bishop, see below)
 Fr. Jean-Louis Martin (1979.06.05 – 1985.05.28)
 Fr. Pierre Samson (1985.05.28 – 1991.05.28)
 Fr. François Lapierre  (1991.05.28 – 1998.04.07) (later Bishop, see below)
 Fr. Roland Laneuville(1998 – 2008.04.28)
 Fr. Guy Charbonneau (2008.04.28 – 2013.01.26) (later Bishop, see below)
 Fr. Martin Laliberté, P.M.E. (2013.05.08 – ...)

Prelates from their ranks 
 Alive
 Bishop Guy Charbonneau, Bishop of Choluteca (Honduras)
 Raúl Corriveau, Bishop emeritus of Choluteca (Honduras)
 François Lapierre, Bishop of Saint-Hyacinthe (Canada)
 Juan Luis Martin Buisson, Titular Bishop of Aquæ in Numidia and Apostolic Vicar emeritus of Pucallpa (Peru)

Deceased, by year of demise
 1943: Fr. Joseph-Albany-Emilien Massé (馬), Apostolic Prefect of Lindong 林東 (PR China)
 1952: Bishop Joseph-Louis-Adhémar Lapierre (石俊聲), Bishop of Siping 四平 (PR China)
 1962: Fr. Adam Grossi, Apostolic Prefect of Malda (India) (March 28, 1952 – 1962)
 1975: Archbishop Clovis Thibauld, Metropolitan Archbishop emeritus of Davao (Philippines)
 1995: Bishop Pierre Fisette, Bishop of Hearst (Canada)
 1997: Bishop Marcel Gérin y Boulay, Bishop emeritus of Choluteca (Honduras)
 2005: Bishop Joseph-Rolland-Gustave Prévost-Godard (趙玉明), Apostolic Vicar emeritus of Pucallpa (Peru)
 2007: Bishop Generoso C. Camiña, Bishop emeritus of Digos (Philippines)
 2009: Archbishop Gilles Ouellet, Metropolitan Archbishop emeritus of Rimouski (Canada)
 2014: Bishop Jean-Louis Giasson, Bishop emeritus of Yoro (Honduras)
 2015: Bishop André Vallée, Bishop emeritus of Hearst (Canada)
 2015: Bishop Guido Plante, Bishop emeritus of Choluteca (Honduras)

See also 
At the Crossroads (À la croisée des chemins), a 1942 film produced by the Société

Sources and external links 
 society website
 GigaCatholic, with biography links

Specific

Societies of apostolic life
Catholic missions
Organizations based in Quebec
Christian organizations established in 1921
Christian organizations based in Canada